Zanha suaveolens is a species of fruit plant in the family Sapindaceae that is endemic to Madagascar where it grows at an elevation of  in such provinces as Mahajanga and Toliara.

References

Endemic flora of Madagascar
Dodonaeoideae
Taxa named by René Paul Raymond Capuron